Me and You and the World is the third studio album, and first major label release, by American acoustic rock performer Dave Barnes. The album was launched internationally on April 1, 2008. The album's first single "Until You", which is a re-recording of a song from his first independent album, was released on February 19, 2008.

Background
Following the release of his second independently recorded and launched album Chasing Mississippi, Dave Barnes began writing material for his next album while touring. During this tour, Barnes co-headlined a tour across the central states of the  United States with best friend Matt Wertz. While on tour, Barnes was approached by Razor and Tie, a commercial recording label. Having studied Recording Industry Management in university, Barnes had developed the opinion that he should not engage in contracts with recording labels, however decided that in order to expand his musical audience, he would need to do so and signed an agreement with Razor and Tie, with whom he recorded the newly written album Me and You and the World.

Songs and singles
As this album is his first commercial release, two songs have been included from his previous independent efforts, "On a Night Like This" and "Until You", which both originated from his first album Brother, Bring the Sun. Originally upon the announcement of the track listing, the song "Someday" was speculated as being a re-recording and minor renaming of "Someday, Sarah" from his second album Chasing Mississippi, however it was actually a separate song altogether. The final track from the album is named "Annie", which is Barnes' wife's given name.

The first single from the album is the remixed version of the song "Until You". The song's arrangement is nearly identical to the original, however is marginally slower, includes various additional guitar fills in the background, and additional backing vocals are evident toward the end of the song.

The album features guest musicians Brooke Fraser of New Zealand on the God-centric song "Believe", Gabe Dixon on piano on "Annie", and with his band on "Someday", and "When a Heart Breaks" features Barnes' friend Matt Wertz on backing vocals. The country-rock song "Good World Gone Bad" features Barnes' producer Ed Cash as both co-writer along with Barnes, and also on electric guitars, including contributing the guitar solo.
.

Release
The album was released on April 1, 2008 internationally, however the album was made available for pre-order beforehand. Any pre-orders registered received a free DVD and an additional CD to "give to the world", as Barnes noted in his blog. The DVD chronicles the making of the album.

Track listing

References

Dave Barnes albums
2008 albums